Keinath Automobilbau was a car manufacturer based in Reutlingen, Germany owned and operated by Horst Keinath. The company began by producing a convertible variant of the Opel Monza, and the Vauxhall Cavalier Mark 2. Along with Hammond & Thiede and Voll, Keinath produced their convertible version of the Opel Ascona (badged C3) from 1983 to 1988.

Recent activities
In 1996, Keinath made a presentation of his first original model, the GTR. The car has a  convertible-coupe body with a hard roof that is stored in the trunk. Limited-series production began in 1997, with a choice of 2.0-litre, 2.5-litre, or 3.0-litre Opel engines. In 2000, a GTR car was shown in Geneva equipped with a 5.7-litre LS family V8 engine, similar to the powerplant used in the Chevrolet Corvette.

In 2003, Keinath planned production of a new model named the GT/C. It was a 2-door sports car available as a coupé (presented in 2001) or a convertible (prototype in 2002).

References

External links
 http://www.autobahnstormers.org/gallery/senator_cab.asp: Keinath Opel Senator B cabriolet conversion (on Autobahnstormers).
 Keinath GTR specs and photos in automobile-catalog.com

Coachbuilders of Germany